Jonas Henriksen may refer to:
 Jonas Henriksen (footballer)
 Jonas Henriksen (cricketer)